The Ondokuz Mayıs University Observatory is a ground-based astronomical observatory operated by the Astronomy and Space Sciences Department at Ondokuz Mayıs University's  Faculty of Science. It is one of the six university observatories in the country.

Instruments
Currently, the observatory consists of following telescopes and instruments:

Telescopes
T14 Meade LX200GPS Schmidt–Cassegrain
 Diameter: 355 mm (14")
 Focal ratio: f/10
 Focal length: 3,550 mm
 Producer: Meade Instruments Corp, California, USA

T5 Meade ETX-125 Maksutov-Cassegrain
 Diameter: 127 mm (5")
 Focal ratio: f/15
 Focal length: 1,900 mm
 Producer: Meade Instruments

Charge-coupled devices
Meade DSI PRO II
 CCD image sensor monochromatic: Sony EXview HAD CCD Sensor (ICX429ALL)
Meade DSI
 CCD sensor: Sony Super HAD Color CCD Sensor

References 

Astronomical observatories in Turkey
Observatory
Buildings and structures in Samsun Province
2006 establishments in Turkey